The zodi is a unit of zodiacal dust. One zodi is the amount of zodiacal dust in the inner Solar System. This dust absorbs light from the Sun and re-radiates it as thermal radiation. The luminosity of the zodiacal dust in the Solar System is about  relative to the luminosity of the Sun, and in practice, this is the observable characteristic defining one zodi.

See also
Cosmic dust

References

Units of density
Units of measurement in astronomy